Countess Cosima von Bülow Pavoncelli (born 15 April 1967) is a British socialite and philanthropist of U.S., Danish, and German ancestry. She is the daughter of the lawyer Claus von Bülow and Sunny von Bülow. She was named on the International Best Dressed List Hall of Fame in 1999.

Early life
Cosima von Bülow was born 15 April 1967 in New York City, where she attended the Chapin School. She then attended Brown University. She is third child of Sunny von Bülow and the only child of Claus von Bülow. Her great-grandfather was Frits Toxwerdt von Bülow af Plüskow (1872–1955), a Danish minister of justice.

She has two half-siblings from her mother's first marriage; Annie-Laurie "Ala" Henriette von Auersperg (born 1958) and Alexander-Georg von Auersperg (born 1959). After her graduation from Brown University in 1989, she moved to London to join her father.

Personal life
In 1996, she married Count Riccardo Pavoncelli (born 8 October 1957 in Naples), an Italian banker. He is the son of Giuseppe Pavoncelli (1929–2010)
and Rosalba Morelli (b. 1935)
He is related to Giuseppe Pavoncelli [it] (1836–1910). The couple have three children:

 Nicolas Antonio Riccardo Pavoncelli (b. 10 August 1998)
 Marina Gaetana Pavoncelli (b. 20 June 2000)
 Antonia Carolina Pavoncelli (b. 23 November 2005)

Philanthropy
She donates money to education programs, cultural institutions, and cancer charities in Britain. She also administers the Sunny Crawford von Bülow Fund at New York City's Morgan Library & Museum, which buys drawings in her mother's name.

In popular culture
The 1990 film Reversal of Fortune was based on Alan Dershowitz' books about the case against Claus von Bülow for the alleged murder attempt on his wife, Sunny, with Kristi Hundt as the older Cosima von Bülow and Kara Emerson as the young Cosima von Bülow.

Ancestry

References

1967 births
Living people
American socialites
British socialites
Italian countesses
Cosima
English people of American descent
English people of Danish descent
English people of German descent
People from Newport, Rhode Island
Brown University alumni
Chapin School (Manhattan) alumni